JHS Pedals is a guitar effects pedals manufacturer with headquarters in Kansas City, Missouri.

History 
JHS Pedals was founded by Joshua Heath Scott in Jackson, Mississippi. He began by repairing and modifying his own pedals, and then sold modified pedals at the local guitar shop before designing his own. Among his early models were the Morning Glory overdrive and the Pulp 'N' Peel compressor. In 2009 Scott moved the company to Kansas City, Missouri, eventually expanding to 10 employees.  JHS released the Panther analog delay in 2011 and also the SuperBolt overdrive and Prestige booster/buffer/enhancer in 2012.

In 2015 JHS collaborated with Keeley Electronics to produce a combined compressor and overdrive pedal, the Steak and Eggs.

In 2018, Scott and Nick Loux released the first episode of The JHS Show, a video blog about guitar pedal history, products and inventors; Scott's screen persona has been described as "the Bill Nye the Science Guy meets Mister Rogers of guitar".

Products 
JHS manufactures and sells pedals with a variety of effects, including the Morning Glory V4, the Muffuletta, the 3 Series, the Pulp'N'Peel V4, the Andy Timmons AT+, the Paul Gilbert PG-14, the Legends of Fuzz series, the Unicorn Univibe, the Lucky Cat, the Double Barrel V4, the 1966 Series and the Colour Box  preamp.

Artist collaborations and documented users 
JHS Pedals has developed custom pedals for artists including Andy Timmons, Butch Walker (who has produced songs for acts like Katy Perry, Weezer and The All-American Rejects), Stu G of Delirious?, Drew Shirley of Switchfoot, Mike Campbell of Tom Petty and the Heartbreakers, and Paul Gilbert.  

JHS Pedals products have been used by guitarists such as the Foo Fighters' Chris Shiflett, John Mayer, Madison Cunningham, Mutemath's Roy Mitchell-Cardenas,  Muse's Matt Bellamy, Beck, Jessica Dobson (Deep Sea Diver and The Shins), Amber Bain (The Japanese House) and U2's the Edge 

In 2017, JHS collaborated with BOSS to produce the Boss JB-2, which combines the Boss Blues Driver and JHS Pedals Angry Charlie.  

In 2017, JHS collaborated with Tim Marcus of Milkman Sound to produce the Milkman boost/slap delay. 

In 2019, JHS severed ties with Ryan Adams and stopped production of his signature pedal, the VCR, after Adams was accused of sexual misconduct. JHS announced they would be rebranding the remaining pedals to the Space Commander and using the proceeds to support work against sexual abuse and assault.

Pedals: The Musical 
On 13 and 14 March 2021, JHS Pedals debuted Pedals: The Musical, a musical comedy about guitar pedals (starring Josh Scott, Rhett Shull and Nick Loux) as a live YouTube JHS Show event.  The production specifically focused on the first seven guitar pedals, invented between 1960 and 1970. Peter Kirn of CDM said that the production was "not quite Joseph and the Technicolor Dreamcoat so much as its own Red, White and Blaine. But it is historically accurate."

Josh Scott has announced plans for follow-up productions in the vein of Pedals: The Musical including performances focusing on the 70s, the 80s, the 90s, the 2000s, and the 2010s. Scott has been quoted saying "We want to do a prequel about the invention of the electric guitar from roughly 1931 through 1960. We want to do some straight plays – meaning just acting, no singing – about the lives of inventors like Les Paul, Leo Fender, George Beauchamp. All these people that have amazing narratives and stories, I could see us doing this for a long time; I’m pretty committed to it because I think it’s a fantastic avenue for teaching."

Guitar.com Articles 
Beginning in 2021, Josh Scott began writing a series of articles for Guitar.com chronicling the history of the electric guitar and, by extension, guitar pedals. In the series, Scott notably tied historical figures like Mark Twain, Benjamin Franklin, Henry Ford and Charles Darwin into the guitar history narrative.

References

Further reading
 
Scott, Josh (5 March 2021). "ELECTRICITY MEETS GUITAR: HOW WE TURNED A LIGHTNING BOLT INTO ROCK ’N’ ROLL.'" Guitar.com. BandLab Technologies.

External links

Guitar effects manufacturing companies
Manufacturing companies based in Kansas City, Missouri